Amon Düül II (or Amon Düül 2, Pronunciation: Amon Düül) is a German rock band. The group is generally considered to be one of the pioneers of the West German krautrock scene. Their 1970 album Yeti was described by British magazine The Wire as "one of the cornerstones of ... the entire Krautrock movement".

History
The band emerged from the radical West German commune scene of the late 1960s, with others in the same commune including some of the future founders of the Red Army Faction. Founding members are Chris Karrer, Dieter Serfas, Falk Rogner (born 14 September 1943), John Weinzierl (born 4 April 1949), and Renate Knaup-Krötenschwanz (born Renate Aschauer-Knaup, 1 July 1948) who, thus far, is the only woman in the band.

The band was founded after Weinzierl and the others met at the Amon Düül 'art commune' in Munich. The commune consisted mainly of university students, who formed a music group initially to fund the commune, with everyone who lived there joining in to play music whether or not they had any experience or ability. The commune split when they were offered an opportunity to record, which was boycotted by the more musically proficient members of the commune (who went on to form Amon Düül II). Recordings were made by the other members but were of very poor quality and were only released later (under the name Amon Düül) to capitalise on the success of Amon Düül II's albums. As Amon Düül II grew and personnel changed, they still remained a commune, living together as a band.

Their first album Phallus Dei ('God's Phallus'), released in 1969, consisted of pieces drawn from the group's live set at the time. By this time the line-up was built around a core of Karrer (mainly violin and guitar), Weinzierl (guitar, bass, piano), Rogner on keyboards, bass player Dave Anderson, and two drummers (Peter Leopold (born 15 August 1945) who had joined the group from Berlin, and Dieter Serfas. Renate Knaup at this point was only contributing minimal vocals but was very much part of the group. According to Weinzierl by this time "The band played almost every day. We played universities, academies, underground clubs, and every hall with a power socket and an audience". Releasing an album brought the group greater prominence and they began to tour more widely in Germany and abroad, playing alongside groups such as Tangerine Dream, and in Germany staying in other communes including the pioneering Kommune 1 in Berlin.

Their second album Yeti (1970) saw them introducing arranged compositions along with the bluesy violin and guitar jams such as the long improvised title track. The next album Tanz der Lemminge (1971) was based on four extended progressive rock suites. By this time bassist Anderson had returned to England and joined Hawkwind, to be replaced by Lothar Meid (born 28 August 1942), and the group was augmented by synthman Karl-Heinz Hausmann (Karrer had formed a short-lived group in 1966 – supposedly named 'Amon Düül O' – with future Embryo founders Lothar Meid and drummer Christian Burchard).

Still touring widely, they recorded their Live in London album in late 1972 and in 1975 signed with Atlantic Records in the US, and United Artists Records Germany and initially disbanded in 1981.

As well as their albums and live shows ADII received offers to write music for films, winning a German film award, the Deutscher Filmpreis, for their contribution to the film San Domingo.

Amon Düül II's drummer, Peter Leopold, died on 8 November 2006. A memorial service was held for Leopold in Munich, where the remaining members of Amon Düül II sang a song for him. Leopold was replaced by multi-instrumentalist Daniel Fichelscher, for many years guitarist and drummer of Krautrock group Popol Vuh. Fichelscher is not new to the group, and in fact has had a long affiliation with Amon Düül II, having played with them as early as 1972 on Carnival in Babylon.

Bass player Lothar Meid died on 3 November 2015.

Band members 
 Chris Karrer – violin, guitars, saxophone, vocals (1969–1981)
 John Weinzierl – guitar, bass, vocals (1969–1977)
 Falk Rogner – organ, synthesizer, electronics (1969–1971, 1972–1975, 1981)
 Renate Knaup – vocals, tambourine (1969–1970, 1972–1975, 1981)
 Dieter Serfas – drums (1969)
 Peter Leopold – drums, percussion (1969–1972, 1973–1979, died 2006)
 Christian "Shrat" Thiele – bongos, vocals, violin (1969–1970)
 Dave Anderson – bass (1969–1970)
 Lothar Meid – bass, vocals (1971–1973, 1974, died 2015)
 Karl-Heinz Hausmann – keyboards, organ, electronics (1971–1972)
 Danny Fichelscher – drums, percussion, guitar (1972, 1981)
 Robby Heibl – bass, guitar, violin, vocals (1973, 1975)
 Nando Tischer – guitar, vocals (1975)
 Klaus Ebert – guitar, bass, vocals (1976–1979)
 Stefan Zauner – keyboards, synthesizer, vocals (1976–1979)
 Jörg Evers – bass, guitar, synthesizer (1981)

Discography

Studio albums

Live albums

Compilations

Singles

Legacy 
Amon Düül II influenced such bands in late 70s like Hungarian psychedelic hardcore 'shaman punk' band Galloping Coroners.

References

External links

Krautrock musical groups
Musical groups established in 1969
German experimental musical groups
German progressive rock groups
German psychedelic rock music groups